Avelia Liberty is a tilting high-speed passenger train built for the North American market by French manufacturer Alstom and assembled in the United States. Amtrak has ordered 28 train sets for use on its flagship Acela service along the Northeast Corridor between Boston and Washington, D.C., via New York City and Philadelphia.

It is part of the Avelia family of high-speed trains but adapted to conform with North American railroad standards, including U.S. Federal Railroad Administration crashworthiness standards. Amtrak says that compared to the prior generation, these trainsets would allow for improved frequency and greater capacity on the Acela service.

, the trains are undergoing testing, and are expected to enter passenger service in late 2023.

History
In August 2016, Amtrak announced a $2.4 billion loan from the United States Department of Transportation for the purchase of new high-speed train sets for the Acela service from Alstom. Alstom will also provide long-term technical support and supply spare components and parts. These next generation train sets would replace the 20 existing Bombardier-Alstom train sets that were nearing the end of their useful service life. The 28 train sets ordered would allow for more frequent service on the Northeast Corridor, including half-hourly peak service between New York City and Washington, D.C. 

U.S. assembly of the train sets is taking place at Alstom's plants in Hornell and Rochester, New York. Initial construction of car bodies and major components began at Hornell in October 2017. The first prototype set was sent to the Transportation Technology Center (TTC) in Pueblo, Colorado in February 2020 for testing on the high-speed test track. A second prototype was delivered in March 2020 to Amtrak for testing along the service tracks in the Northeast which began in May 2020. The first test run up to Boston South Station occurred on September 28.

By 2020, the first train set was expected to enter revenue service in early 2022, with all train sets in service by late 2022, at which point Amtrak would retire the previous Acela fleet. However, full high-speed testing is not expected to begin until late 2022. In May 2022, 15 of the 28 trainsets were in "some phase of production".

Tetsing at up to  took place in 2022. , the first trainsets are expected to enter revenue service in late 2023.

Features and production 
Although Amtrak initially favored a New Pendolino derivative, the train set trailers are based on the AGV and power car design is based on Avelia Horizon, designed for the French high-speed rail network (TGV), but adapted to conform with North American railroad standards, including U.S. Federal Railroad Administration (FRA)'s crashworthiness standards. 

Besides being more numerous compared to the prior generation, the new train sets will each have 378 seats and 8 wheelchair locations for a total capacity of 386 passengers (25 percent more than the current train sets), allowing for greater passenger capacity. The train sets will be equipped with an active tilt system, dubbed Tiltronix by Alstom and based on Pendolinos, that will allow higher speeds on curved portions of the corridor track at a maximum tilt angle of 6.3°.

Each Avelia Liberty trainset has power cars at each end of the train, and (initially) nine articulated passenger cars. An additional three passenger cars can be added if demand grows. The power cars include a Crash Energy Management system to help meet the FRA's Tier-III standards while allowing a 30 percent reduction in train weight. These trains will also have USB ports, power sockets, Wi-Fi, accessibility features, touchless bathroom facilities, trip information displays, a cafe car, improved HVAC, and other conveniences.

Many infrastructure upgrades are currently underway or completed, allowing for more frequent service and faster speeds.

See also 

 Avelia Euroduplex, a European bilevel high-speed train manufactured by Alstom
 Pendolino, a European family of high-speed tilting trains, currently manufactured by Alstom
 High-speed rail in the United States

References

External links

 Amtrak - The Next Generation of Acela - official page
 Avelia Liberty high-speed-train on Alstom's website.
 Footage of high-speed testing in Pueblo, CO from Amtrak's YouTube channel.
 New Acela Interior Preview from Amtrak's YouTube channel.

High-speed rail in the United States
High-speed trains
Pendolino
Alstom high-speed trains
High-speed trains of the United States
Electric multiple units with locomotive-like power cars
Amtrak rolling stock
Northeast Corridor
Train-related introductions in 2023
25 kV AC multiple units